Gentle Thunder, born Lisa Carpenter, is a Native American flautist of Cree heritage with three solo albums to date. From Kirkland, Washington, Gentle Thunder also plays the hammered dulcimer and percussion instruments. In 2006 she released Beyond Words with Will Clipman and Amochip Dabney, two musicians who back R. Carlos Nakai. The album was a 2006 Grammy nominee for Best New Age Album. She has also collaborated with singer-songwriter Mariee Sioux.

Discography

References

Cree people
Native American flautists
Musicians from Kirkland, Washington
Living people

Year of birth missing (living people)